Ménéac is a commune in the Morbihan department in Brittany in north-western France. Inhabitants of Ménéac are called in French Ménéacois.

See also
Communes of the Morbihan department

References

External links

 Mayors of Morbihan Association 

Communes of Morbihan